Voyage of the Unicorn is a 2001 television film directed by Philip Spink and starring Beau Bridges, Chantal Conlin and Heather McEwen. The film is based on James C. Christensen's book Voyage of the Basset.

Plot
Dr. Alan Aisling is an antiquities professor who has lost his wife and struggles to keep his daughters' spirits high and his loneliness at bay. His younger daughter Cassie, daydreams about the mythical world her illustrator mother left behind in her drawings and annoys her older sister Miranda.

Then something magical happens: the family find themselves fleeing a plague of monstrous trolls by boarding a mysterious ship called The Unicorn. They are given a quest to find the benevolent dragon that once ruled the legendary faerie isles, before the demon trolls arrived.

They partake of the quest that shows them the wonder of the mythological worlds: fire-breathing dragons, the mermaids' siren songs and the Minotaur's labyrinth, and try to re-ignite an enthusiasm for life within the family.

Cast

Release

The film was released on a DVD with the TV film "The Old Curiosity Shop" (starring Peter Ustinov) in 2007. It was considered an "extra".

Both parts were released by Hallmark Entertainment as a single stand-alone feature on VHS.

External links

RHI Films

Sonar Entertainment miniseries
2001 television films
2001 films
American television films
American fantasy adventure films
Canadian fantasy adventure films
Films based on American novels
Films based on classical mythology
Canadian television films
2000s English-language films
2000s Canadian films